'4501 Eurypylos  is a Jupiter trojan from the Greek camp, approximately  in diameter. It was discovered on 4 February 1989 by Belgian astronomer Eric Elst at ESO's La Silla Observatory in Chile. The dark Jovian asteroid has a short rotation period of 6.1 hours. It was named after the Thessalian king Eurypylus from Greek mythology.

Orbit and classification 

Eurypylos is a dark Jovian asteroid in a 1:1 orbital resonance with Jupiter. It is located in the leading Greek camp at the Gas Giant's  Lagrangian point, 60° ahead of its orbit . It is also a non-family asteroid in the Jovian background population. It orbits the Sun at a distance of 4.9–5.5 AU once every 11 years and 11 months (4,342 days; semi-major axis of 5.21 AU). Its orbit has an eccentricity of 0.05 and an inclination of 8° with respect to the ecliptic. The body's observation arc begins with a precovery taken at Palomar Observatory in December 1951, more than 36 years prior to its official discovery observation at La Silla.

Physical characteristics 

Eurypylos is an assumed C-type, while most larger Jupiter trojans are D-type asteroids.

Rotation period 

In March 2013, a rotational lightcurve of Eurypylos was obtained from photometric observations by Robert Stephens at the Center for Solar System Studies in Landers, California. Lightcurve analysis gave a rotation period of  hours with a brightness amplitude of 0.24 magnitude.

Diameter and albedo 

According to the survey carried out by the NEOWISE mission of NASA's Wide-field Infrared Survey Explorer, Eurypylos measures 45.52 kilometers in diameter and its surface has an albedo of 0.065, while the Collaborative Asteroid Lightcurve Link assumes a standard albedo for a carbonaceous asteroid of 0.057 and calculates a diameter of 46.30 kilometers based on an absolute magnitude of 10.4.

Naming 

This minor planet was named from Greek mythology after the legendary king Eurypylus, the leader of the Thessalian contingent, who brought 40 ships to the siege of Troy. During the Trojan War, he was wounded by an arrow from Paris but was rescued by Patroclus. The official naming citation was published by the Minor Planet Center on 4 October 1990.

Notes

References

External links 
 Asteroid Lightcurve Database (LCDB), query form (info )
 Dictionary of Minor Planet Names, Google books
 Discovery Circumstances: Numbered Minor Planets (1)-(5000) – Minor Planet Center
 Asteroid 4501 Eurypylos at the Small Bodies Data Ferret
 
 

004501
Discoveries by Eric Walter Elst
Named minor planets
19890204